Ab Khar Zahreh (also Romanized as Āb Khar Zahreh) is a village in Shalal and Dasht-e Gol Rural District, in the Central District of Andika County, Khuzestan Province, Iran. At the 2006 census, its population was 241, in 40 families.

References 

Populated places in Andika County